Horst Freiherr Treusch von Buttlar-Brandenfels (2 September 1900 – 8 January 1990) was a German general during World War II, commonly referred to as Treusch, but also as Buttlar-Brandenfels.

In 1944, Treusch was Army Operations Chief (OKW Major-General); he played a major role in not releasing the Panzer reserves (Panzer Lehr and the 12th SS Division) which had been requested  by Gerd von Rundstedt. Rundstedt was Generalfeldmarschall of the German army during the initial Normandy landings by Allied troops.

He was briefly in command of the 11th Panzer Division of the Wehrmacht from April 1945 until the end of the war in May.

References

1900 births
1990 deaths
Military personnel from Kassel
People from Hesse-Nassau
German Army personnel of World War I
German Army generals of World War II
Reichswehr personnel
Major generals of the German Army (Wehrmacht)
Barons of Germany
Prussian Army personnel
Recipients of the Pour le Mérite (military class)